The 2013–14 Ghanaian Premier League (known as the First Capital Plus Bank Premier League for sponsorship reasons) season is the 55th season of top-tier football in Ghana. The competition began on 15 September 2013, and ended on 4 June 2014, with Asante Kotoko crowned as champions.

Teams and venues

Team Movements

Teams promoted following 2011–2012 Glo Premier League season
Tema Youth, (Tema, Greater Accra)
Bechem United, (Bechem, Brong-Ahafo)
Wassaman United, (Tarkwa, Western)

Teams promoted following 2012–2013 Glo Premier League season
 Sekondi Hasaacas F.C., (Sekondi-Takoradi, Western)
 International Allies F.C., (Accra, Greater Accra)
 Bechem United, (Bechem, Brong-Ahafo)
 Winner of the 2012–13 Ghanaian FA Cup qualified for the 2014 CAF Confederation Cup.
 Runner-up of the 2013–14 Ghanaian FA Cup qualified for the 2015 CAF Confederation Cup.

Standings

Top scorers

References

External links
 Season at soccerway.com

Ghana Premier League seasons
Ghanaian Premier League
1